The 1909 Washington football team was an American football team that represented the University of Washington during the 1909 college football season. In its second season under coach Gil Dobie, the team compiled a 7–0 record, shut out six of seven opponents, and outscored all opponents by a combined total of 214 to 6. Melville Mucklestone was the team captain.

Schedule

References

Washington
Washington Huskies football seasons
College football undefeated seasons
Washington football